Chinley railway station serves the village of Chinley in Derbyshire, England. It is unstaffed and is managed by Northern Trains.

History

The original station was built in 1867 by the Midland Railway on the extension of its Manchester, Buxton, Matlock and Midlands Junction Railway, which became its main line to London from Manchester. Originally, the Midland had planned to extend through Buxton, but the LNWR already had a line there. So, the Midland built a line through Chinley and Buxworth to join the Manchester, Sheffield and Lincolnshire Railway at New Mills; this was an association which became known as the Sheffield and Midland Railway Companies' Committee.

From Millers Dale, the line crossed the Black Brook valley at Chapel Milton. This became a double viaduct when the Dore and Chinley line was built in 1894, with a north curve forming a triangular junction just over a mile to the east. Congestion soon became a problem on the section west of Chinley and so the Midland quickly sought parliamentary approval to add additional capacity, with the enabling act passed in 1900 and the contract for a replacement station let shortly afterwards.

The new station was opened on 1 June 1902, when the line through Disley Tunnel to Heaton Mersey (and thence on to ) was opened and the extra tracks between Chinley North Junction & New Mills South Junction were commissioned. It also became the terminus of the Dore and Chinley line, instead of Buxton. The old station buildings were dismantled and re-erected on Maynestone Road as a private house. Many express trains from the Midlands and London would call there to attach or detach coaches for destinations in the North West (including  and  High Level), as well as the main Midland terminus at Manchester Central. This practice became somewhat less prevalent after the 1923 Grouping when the London, Midland and Scottish Railway took over but, in the 1930s, some 40 eastbound and 38 westbound trains either called or started/terminated at the station each weekday.

Decline

After World War II and the nationalisation of the railways in January 1948, passenger traffic from the station declined and the number of station calls with it, though four southbound London expresses and five from the capital still featured in the station's 1965 timetable. The Hope Valley route was also earmarked for closure in the report, but this was not implemented by the government due to the number of isolated communities it served along its route; the Woodhead line was closed to passenger services instead. The 1902 line through Heaton Mersey to Manchester Central and the link via  to  would also close; all trains henceforth ran to Piccadilly via New Mills and  instead.

With the closure of the line to the south in 1967/8, Chinley railway station lost its importance. The few surviving London trains via Sheffield ceased to call in 1972 and had disappeared altogether by 1979. Two of the four lines through the station were subsequently removed in 1981/2,  as part of a track rationalisation and re-signalling scheme; the platforms they served were closed, along with the station signal box. The remaining two were then realigned to serve the middle 'island' platform and the remaining buildings were demolished. The site of the southern island platform has been redeveloped and is now occupied by houses.

Since then, it has served as a local commuter station on the Hope Valley route; the line itself still carries significant quantities of freight traffic, mainly limestone aggregates and cement, in addition to a frequent passenger service. Since the summer 2017 timetable, all fast Sheffield to Manchester services use this route in order to call at Stockport, whilst the Marple route is used by the local stopping services that call here.

Facilities
There is a waiting shelter on the platform, along with timetable information posters, CIS displays, ticket vending machine, bench seating and a customer help point.  Announcements are currently not functioning. Train running details can also be obtained using the telephone at the station entrance.  No level access is available, as the only route from the entrance to the platform is via the stepped footbridge.  Local rail users have been campaigning for the station to be made accessible for wheelchair users and parents with pushchairs since 2008, but the necessary funding under the 'Access for All' scheme has not yet been allocated.

Services

The typical service is one train every hour to Sheffield and to Manchester Piccadilly.

References

External links

Railway stations in Derbyshire
DfT Category F2 stations
Former Midland Railway stations
Railway stations in Great Britain opened in 1867
Railway stations served by East Midlands Railway
Northern franchise railway stations